The 2004 African Women's Championship qualification process was organized by the Confederation of African Football (CAF) to decide the participating teams of the 2004 African Women's Championship. South Africa qualified automatically as hosts, while the remaining seven spots were determined by the qualifying rounds, which took place from May to July 2004. 

From this tournament onwards, the defending champions does not receive automatic qualification.

Teams
A total of 17 national teams participated in the qualifying process.

Teams who withdrew are in italics.

Format
Qualification ties were played on a home-and-away two-legged basis. If the aggregate score was tied after the second leg, the away goals rule would be applied, and if still level, the penalty shoot-out would be used to determine the winner (no extra time would be played).

The seven winners of the final round qualified for the final tournament.

Schedule
The schedule of the qualifying rounds was as follows.

Preliminary round

|}
1 Uganda withdrew.

Congo won 4–2 on aggregate and advanced to the first round.

Malawi won by default and advanced to the first round.

Tanzania won 5–1 on aggregate and advanced to the first round.

First round

|}

Cameroon won 2–0 on aggregate and qualified for the final tournament.

Ethiopia won 9–0 on aggregate and qualified for the final tournament.

Zimbabwe won 7–0 on aggregate and qualified for the final tournament.

Algeria won 3–2 on aggregate and qualified for the final tournament.

Ghana won 22–0 on aggregate and qualified for the final tournament.

1 The match was abandoned at the 76th minute after an officer from the riot police mistakenly fired tear gas which dispersed fans rushing to find an open space. 

Nigeria won 12–3 on aggregate and qualified for the final tournament.

Originally, DR Congo qualified for the final tournament after Gabon withdrew. DR Congo subsequently withdrew, meaning CAF were required to select a lucky loser to qualify for the final tournament.

Mali, as the lucky loser, thus qualified for the final tournament.

Goalscorers
Akua Anokyewaa and Adjoa Bayor, both from Ghana, were the top scorers of the qualifying process with 6 goals each.
6 goals

 Akua Anokyewaa
 Adjoa Bayor

5 goals

 Florence Okoe
 Cynthia Uwak

4 goals

 Birtukan Gebrekirstos
 Patience Avre
 Nomsa Moyo

3 goals

 Feleke Addis
 Mwapewa Mtumwa

2 goals

 Dalila Zerrouki
 Carmen Aguilera Angono
 Anita Amenuku

1 goal

 Naïma Bouhenni
 Séraphine Mbida
 Marlyse Ngo Ndoumbouk
 Ndiaye Mpassou
 Saya Ndolou
 Semira Kemal
 Helen Seifu
 Elizabeth Baidu
 Memuna Darku
 Gloria Foriwaa
 Fatou Camara
 Diaty N'Diaye
 Ijeoma Obi
 Melkuleyi Titilayo
 Jerome Ulunma
 Awa Diop
 Mamy N'Diaye
 Bathe Thiaw
 Mwanaidi Yusuf
 Sharon Kulunga
 Sithandekile Mathobela
 Margaret Simao

Unknown goalscorers
: 2 additional goals
: 1 additional goal
: 1 additional goal

Qualified teams

The following teams qualified for the final tournament.

1 Bold indicates champions for that year. Italic indicates hosts for that year.

References

CAF
Women
2004